Butyriboletus roseopurpureus is a species of fungus in the family Boletaceae. Found in eastern North America, it was officially described in 2000 as a species of Boletus, and transferred to the genus Butyriboletus in 2015.

See also
List of North American boletes

References

External links

roseopurpureus
Fungi described in 2000
Fungi of the United States
Fungi without expected TNC conservation status